Busan Harbor Bridge (Hangul: 부산항대교; Hanja: 釜山港大橋) is a bridge in Busan, South Korea. The bridge connects the districts of Yeongdo District and Nam District. The bridge was completed in 2014. The Running Man team actually filmed an episode capturing the image of the bridge in episode 420.

See also
 Transportation in South Korea
 List of bridges in South Korea

Bridges completed in 2014
Bridges in Busan
Yeongdo District
Nam District, Busan
Cable-stayed bridges in South Korea
Toll bridges in South Korea